The Seven Apostles (Sveti Sedmochislenitsi) are seven saints venerated in the Bulgarian Orthodox Church since the 10th century.

They are also revered in other Churches as the creators and distributors of the Glagolitic and Cyrillic script. These Saints are Saint Cyril and Methodius who created the Glagolitic script, and their five students Kliment, Naum, Gorazd, Sava and Angelariy. Although Constantine of Preslav is considered a direct disciple of Methodius, the Church traditionally does not include him because he is not canonized. 

In Russian Orthodox Church, Cyril and Methodius are remembered separately, and their disciples are recognized as Equal-to-apostles. The Bulgarian Orthodox Church has set July 27 as the day of the Assumption of Clement of Ohrid and the day of the Seven Saints.

Footnote

See also
Pliska Literary School
Ohrid Literary School

Bulgarian National Revival
Groups of Eastern Orthodox saints
Medieval Bulgarian saints
Bulgarian Orthodox Church
Cyrillo-Methodian studies
Bulgarian culture